Fengguiwei Fort is a former Dutch fortification located in Magong, Penghu, Taiwan. The fort sat atop a small hill on a peninsula across the bay from Magong Harbor. As of today, little of the original structure remains.

Structure 
The fort was built of compacted soil in a square with a side length of 55 m and a height of 7 m. On the southwest side facing the rest of the peninsula, the walls were covered with rock, and a trench was dug as well; the other three walls were covered with wood. Bastions were built on all four corners.

History 
In 1622, the Dutch, based in Batavia, were seeking to establish a stronger presence in East Asia. A fleet of six ships led by Cornelis Reijersen attempted to capture Macau to disrupt the Portuguese's profitable Macau-Nagasaki route. However, despite outnumbering the defenders, Reijersen's fleet was defeated and repelled. Frustrated, they turned to the Pescadores (modern day Penghu) to set up a base and coerce the Chinese into trading with them.

Reijersen built his fort atop a hill known as Shetou Mountain (蛇頭山), forcing 1,500 locals into its construction. Allegedly, 1,300 of the workmen died due to starvation. From there, the Dutch began raiding Chinese trading ships in an attempt to "induce the Chinese to trade by force or from fear." Their stay in the Pescadores, however, was short lived, ending in a successful Chinese offensive on the fort in August 1624. The Dutch and Chinese reached an agreement to destroy the fort, and the Dutch would move to Formosa (modern day Taiwan), where they built Fort Zeelandia, remaining there for 38 years.

In 1895, Japanese Admiral Itō Sukeyuki rearmed the site as an artillery battery as part of the Japanese invasion of Taiwan. These cannons were removed in 1945 with the surrender of Japan.

See also 
 Dutch Formosa

References 

1622 establishments in Dutch Formosa
1624 disestablishments in Dutch Formosa
Buildings and structures associated with the Dutch East India Company
Buildings and structures completed in 1622
Dutch Formosa
Former properties of the Dutch East India Company
National monuments of Taiwan